General elections were held in the Northern Mariana Islands on 3 November 2007, concurrently with a double referendum. The Republican Party won a majority of seats in the House of Representatives, and both referendums were approved.

Background
The two referendums were on proposed amendments to the constitution. One would amend Chapter XV, article 2, section a to establish a new Higher Education Commission to license post-secondary educational institutions. The other would amend  Chapter III, article 4 to require a second round in the elections for governor and lieutenant governor if no candidate received over 50% in the first round.

Results

Legislature

Senate

House

Referendums

Establishing a new Higher Education Commission

Two-round elections for Governor

References

External links
Vote CNMI

Northern Mariana
 
Northern Mariana
Referendums in the Northern Mariana Islands